The 44th International Emmy Awards took place on November 21, 2016, in New York City and was hosted by actor Alan Cumming. The award ceremony, presented by the International Academy of Television Arts and Sciences (IATAS), honors all TV programming produced and originally aired outside the United States.

Summary

Ceremony
Nominations for the 44th International Emmy Awards were announced on September 26, 2016, by the International Academy of Television Arts & Sciences (IATAS). There are 40 Nominees across 10 categories and 15 countries. Nominees come from Argentina, Brazil, Canada, Colombia, France, Germany, Japan, Philippines, Singapore, South Africa, South Korea, Sweden, United Kingdom, United Arab Emirates and the United States.

In addition to the presentation of the International Emmys for programming and performances, the International Academy presented two special awards. Shonda Rhimes received the Founders Award, and Maria Rørbye Rønn of the Danish Broadcasting Corporation received the Directorate Award.

Winners and nominees

References

External links 
 Official website

International Emmy Awards ceremonies
International
International